David Frederick Penfold (born 23 October 1964) is a former field hockey player from New Zealand, who finished in eighth position with the Men's National Team, nicknamed Black Sticks, at the 1992 Summer Olympics in Barcelona, Spain. He was born in Christchurch.

He attended Burnside High School, Christchurch from 1978 to 1982.

References

External links
 
 New Zealand Olympic Committee

New Zealand male field hockey players
Field hockey players at the 1992 Summer Olympics
Olympic field hockey players of New Zealand
Field hockey players from Christchurch
1964 births
Living people